Gandhi Godse – Ek Yudh is a 2023 Indian-Hindi language alternate history film written and directed by Rajkumar Santoshi, and produced by Manila Santoshi. The film stars Deepak Antani and Chinmay Mandlekar in the lead roles. The film deals with a situation in which Mahatma Gandhi survives his  assassination and thereafter decides not only to pardon Nathuram Godse but also to socialize with him.

Plot 
Godse holds Gandhi responsible for the partition and misery of Hindus. He shoots Gandhi on 30 January 1948 but Gandhi is miraculously saved and pardons Godse. After breaking his ties with the Congress, Gandhi begins his Gram Swaraj Movement to inspire villages towards self-reliance. Meanwhile, the system highlights Godse's writing and manipulates public sentiment against Gandhi whose interference has created ruckus within the government. This leads to Gandhi's arrest which he insists on serving with Godse. They have multiple debates and arguments, even confrontations in prison. Will this war of ideologies resolve their differences?

Cast 
 Deepak Antani as Mohandas Karamchand Gandhi
 Chinmay Mandlekar as Nathuram Vinayak Godse
 Tanisha Santoshi as Sushma
 Anuj Saini as Naren
 Pawan Chopra as Jawaharlal Nehru
 Ghanshyam Srivastav as Sardar Vallabhbhai Patel
 Sandeep Bhojak as Jailor Amod Rai

Production 
Santoshi confessed in pre-release promotions that it was hard to receive investment for such a large scale film with a potentially controversial subject. He added that it was only after composer A. R. Rahman accepted to do the film, investors started showing interest, and the film may not have been made if Rahman said 'no'.

Filming commenced on 20 September 2020 and was wrapped on 6 May 2022. Bhopal and Mumbai served as the principal locations.

Music

The music is composed by A. R. Rahman in his third collaboration with Rajkumar Santoshi after Pukar and The Legend of Bhagat Singh. The director-composer duo had not collaborated for over two decades, though Rahman was approached for Khakee and he did not sign it due to scheduling conflicts.

Release 
The film was released in India on 26 January 2023, coinciding with the Indian Republic Day.

Reception 
The film received mixed reviews from critics, who praised its performances, visual style, cinematography, but criticized its screenplay and story.

The dispute over the context of the film and Santoshi had sought police protection after allegedly receiving threats.

References

External links 
 

2020s Hindi-language films
Films scored by A. R. Rahman
Alternate history films
Indian historical drama films
Cultural depictions of Mahatma Gandhi